The Austin Acoustic were a women's American football team based in Austin, Texas. The Acoustic competed a member of the Legends Football League (LFL) with home games at H-E-B Center in the Austin suburb of Cedar Park, Texas.

Following the 2019 season, the LFL ceased operations and relaunched as the Extreme Football League (X League), which first played in 2022. All former LFL teams received new brands and the Acoustic were replaced by the Austin Sound.

History 
In the latter half of 2015, the Legends Football League (LFL) announced that two new franchises, plus a revival of the league's Dallas-area franchise, would join the league beginning with the 2016 season. The new Austin-based franchise adopted the name Acoustic, which was chosen from local fan submissions. The Acoustic were twentieth franchise in LFL history.

Seasons

2016 season

2017 season

2018 season

2019 season

Notes

References

External links
Legends Football League website 
Austin Acoustic webpage at LFLUS.com 

 
 

Legends Football League US teams
American football teams established in 2015
2015 establishments in Texas
American football teams in Austin, Texas
Cedar Park, Texas
Women in Texas